Jerusalem Council or Council of Jerusalem may refer to:

 Sanhedrin, assembly in ancient Judaism
 Council of Jerusalem, early Christian council held around AD 50
 Council of Jerusalem (536), council of bishops
 Synod of Jerusalem (1443), Eastern Orthodox council
 Synod of Jerusalem (1672), Eastern Orthodox council
 Jerusalem City Council, the representative organ of the modern day Jerusalem Municipality